Poisonous Roses is a 2018 Egyptian drama film directed by Fawzi Saleh. It was selected as the Egyptian entry for the Best International Feature Film at the 92nd Academy Awards, but it was not nominated.

Plot
Two siblings living in the impoverished tannery district of Cairo with their mother have a strained, peculiar relationship.

Cast
 Mohamed Berakaa as El-sheikh
 Safaa El Toukhy as The Mother
 Ibrahim El-Nagari as Sakr
 Mahmood Hemaidah as The Magician
 Marihan Magdy as Tahya

See also
 List of submissions to the 92nd Academy Awards for Best International Feature Film
 List of Egyptian submissions for the Academy Award for Best International Feature Film

References

External links
 

2018 films
2018 drama films
Egyptian drama films
2010s Arabic-language films